Daheim may refer to:

 Mary Daheim (born 1937), American novelist
 John Daheim (1916–1991), American stuntman and actor
 Daheim, German magazine
 "Daheim", the actual name of the Hitchcock Estate in Millbrook, New York